The 2023 Tameside Metropolitan Borough Council elections are scheduled to take place on 4 May 2023 alongside other local elections in the United Kingdom. Due to boundary changes, all 57 seats on Tameside Metropolitan Borough Council are to be contested.

Background 
The Local Government Act 1972 created a two-tier system of metropolitan counties and districts covering Greater Manchester, Merseyside, South Yorkshire, Tyne and Wear, the West Midlands, and West Yorkshire starting in 1974. Manchester was a district of the Greater Manchester metropolitan county. The Local Government Act 1985 abolished the metropolitan counties, with metropolitan districts taking on most of their powers as metropolitan boroughs. The Greater Manchester Combined Authority was created in 2011 and began electing the mayor of Greater Manchester from 2017, which was given strategic powers covering a region coterminous with the former Greater Manchester metropolitan county.

Since its creation in 1974, Tameside has always been under Labour control, aside from 1978 to 1982 when the Conservatives held a majority.

In June 2022 the Local Government Boundary Commission for England made The Tameside (Electoral Changes) Order 2022, which officially abolished the existing 19 wards and created 19 new wards with different boundaries. Because of this change, all 57 seats on the council, three per ward, are to be contested.

Electoral process 
The election will take place using the plurality block voting system, a form of first-past-the-post voting, with each ward being represented by three councillors. The candidate with the most votes in each ward will serve a four-year term ending in 2027, the second-placed candidate will serve a three-year term anding in 2026 and the third-placed candidate will serve a one-year term ending in 2024.

All registered electors (British, Irish, Commonwealth and European Union citizens) living in Oldham aged 18 or over will be entitled to vote in the election. People who live at two addresses in different councils, such as university students with different term-time and holiday addresses, are entitled to be registered for and vote in elections in both local authorities. Voting in-person at polling stations will take place from 07:00 to 22:00 on election day, and voters will be able to apply for postal votes or proxy votes in advance of the election.

Previous council composition

Candidates 

Asterisks denote incumbent councillors seeking re-election.

Ashton Hurst

Ashton St Michael's

Ashton Waterloo

Audenshaw

Denton North East

Denton South

Denton West

Droylsden East

Droylsden West

Dukinfield

Dukinfield Stalybridge

Hyde Godley

Hyde Newton

Hyde Werneth

Longendale

Mossley

St Peter's

Stalybridge North

Stalybridge South

References

Tameside
Tameside Council elections